Patrik Mattias Jonsson (born 1974) is a Swedish trade unionist and politician of the Social Democratic Party who has been serving as a member of the Riksdag since 2010, representing the Gothenburg Municipality.

Early career
Jonsson has had several jobs including at PLM AB in Lysekil and Volvo Cars/Pininfarina in Uddevalla. He has held various roles at the IF Metall trade union.

Political career 
Jonsson was a member of the municipal councils in Lysekil Municipality (1991-1997) and Stenungsund Municipality (2002-2005).

In addition to his committee assignments, Jonsson has been a member of the Swedish delegation to the Parliamentary Assembly of the Council of Europe (PACE) since 2022.

References

1974 births
Living people
Members of the Riksdag 2010–2014
Members of the Riksdag 2014–2018
Members of the Riksdag 2018–2022
Members of the Riksdag 2022–2026
Members of the Riksdag from the Social Democrats
People from Gothenburg
People from Lysekil Municipality
Swedish trade unionists